Wolfgang Gayler (19 December 1934 – 6 October 2011) was a German conductor and pianist.

Life 
Gayler was born in Stuttgart. From 1945 to 1954 he attended the Reutlingen college.. He then studied at the University of Stuttgart, the State University of Music and Performing Arts Stuttgart, the Hochschule für Musik Freiburg and the University of Freiburg. He was a scholarship holder of the Studienstiftung.

As répétiteur, he first began in Freiburg im Breisgau. In 1965 he moved to the Staatstheater Nürnberg. In 1977 he became Deputy Music Director and in 1993 Music director of the City of Nuremberg. A guest conducting led him to the Hamburg State Opera in 1984.

Gayler died in Nuremberg at age 76.

Bibliography 
 Norbert Beleke (publisher): . The German Who's Who. 2007/2008. Volume 46, Schmidt-Römhild, Lübeck 2007, .

References

External links 
 

1934 births
2011 deaths
Musicians from Stuttgart
German conductors (music)
German classical pianists
Male classical pianists
20th-century German musicians
20th-century German male musicians